Chilonis may refer to:

 Chilonis (daughter of Leotychidas) (3rd century BC) Spartan queen, daughter of Leotychidas, wife of Cleonymus, then Acrotatus, and mother of Areus II
 Chilonis (wife of Cleombrotus II) (3rd century BC) Spartan queen, daughter of the king Leonidas II and wife of Cleombrotus II